Yuriy Georgiyevich Sedykh (11 June 1955 – 14 September 2021) was a track and field athlete who represented the Soviet Union from 1976–1991 in the hammer throw. He was a European, World and Olympic Champion, and holds the world record with a throw of 86.74 m in 1986.

Career 
Sedykh was born in Novocherkassk, Russia, and grew up in Nikopol, Ukraine. He took up track and field in 1967 under coach Vladimir Ivanovich Volovik. He trained at Burevestnik and later at the Armed Forces sports society in Kyiv, attaining the rank of major in the Soviet Army. From 1972 he was coached by Anatoliy Bondarchuk, who is widely regarded as one of the best hammer coaches in the world. In 1973 he became a member of the USSR National Junior Team.

Competition 
Sedykh won gold medals at the 1976 Summer Olympics and 1980 Summer Olympics as well as taking first at the 1986 Goodwill Games. He set a world record of 86.74 m at the 1986 European championships in Stuttgart, where he won his third title in a row. He also came first at the 1991 World Championships. Only Sedykh and Sergey Litvinov have thrown over 86 meters in the history of the sport (Ivan Tsikhan's 86.73 m throw in 2005 was annulled by the IAAF in April 2014 due to doping sanctions).

Coaching 
Sedykh coached French hammer throwers, for example Nicolas Figère (80.88 m).

Technique 
Unlike many throwers, Sedykh employed three rotations rather than four. He often practised with lighter and heavier hammers. His technique was based on 'pushing' the ball left and letting the hammer turn him.

Personal life 
Previously married to Soviet 100 m hurdles Olympic champion Lyudmila Kondratyeva, Sedykh subsequently married former Soviet shot-putter and world-record holder Natalya Lisovskaya who won gold in the 1988 Olympics. They had one daughter, Alexia, born in 1993, who came first in the girls' hammer throw at the 2010 Summer Youth Olympics in Singapore. Sedykh and his family moved to Paris, France, where he taught strength and conditioning at higher education level. Sedykh died in France on 14 September 2021 at the age of 66. The urn with the ashes was buried in the Federal Military Memorial Cemetery's Pantheon of Defenders of the Fatherland" in Mytishchi, Russia.

References

Further reading

External links 

1955 births
2021 deaths
Ukrainian male hammer throwers
Soviet male hammer throwers
Russian masters athletes
Olympic male hammer throwers
Olympic athletes of the Soviet Union
Olympic gold medalists for the Soviet Union
Olympic silver medalists for the Soviet Union
Olympic gold medalists in athletics (track and field)
Olympic silver medalists in athletics (track and field)
Athletes (track and field) at the 1976 Summer Olympics
Athletes (track and field) at the 1980 Summer Olympics
Athletes (track and field) at the 1988 Summer Olympics
Medalists at the 1976 Summer Olympics
Medalists at the 1980 Summer Olympics
Medalists at the 1988 Summer Olympics
Universiade medalists in athletics (track and field)
Universiade bronze medalists for the Soviet Union
Medalists at the 1975 Summer Universiade
Medalists at the 1977 Summer Universiade
Medalists at the 1979 Summer Universiade
Goodwill Games medalists in athletics
Competitors at the 1986 Goodwill Games
Competitors at the 1994 Goodwill Games
World Athletics Championships athletes for the Soviet Union
World Athletics Championships winners
World Athletics Championships medalists
European Athletics Championships winners
European Athletics Championships medalists
Soviet Athletics Championships winners
Australian Athletics Championships winners
New Zealand Athletics Championships winners
Track & Field News Athlete of the Year winners
World Athletics record holders
Burevestnik (sports society) athletes
Sportspeople from Rostov Oblast
People from Novocherkassk
Friendship Games medalists in athletics
Burials at the Federal Military Memorial Cemetery